The Orekhovsky is a waterfall in the Sochi National Park. It takes its name from Orekhovka, a settlement in the Khosta District of Sochi. It is located on the Bezumenka stream at its confluence with the Sochi River. Orekhovsky is the second highest waterfall in the city, with a height of 27.5 meters. In the early 20th century, it was known as Melnichny ("the miller's fall"). Nearby is a grove of walnuts and rhododendron.

Other Sochi waterfalls 
Ivanovsky
Polikarya

References 

Waterfalls of Russia
Sochi
Landforms of Krasnodar Krai
Natural monuments of Russia